Ararat is a 2017 horror novel by Christopher Golden.

Synopsis 
After an earthquake reopens a cave on Mount Ararat, revealing a ship that many researchers and treasure seekers identify as Noah's Ark. Inside, explorers uncover demonic opposition.

Reception 
Ararat was well received by critics for its suspense and well developed characters. Dave Simms of Cemetery Dance Publications wrote that "Golden's knack for intertwining sympathetic characters and the horrific with suspense begs for continued reading". The book received the Bram Stoker Award for Novel in 2017.

Adaptation 
In 2019, AGC Television purchased the rights to produce a television series based on Ararat and its sequels. The series was scheduled to begin production on a first season based on the book in late 2019.

References 

2017 novels
2010s horror novels
Novels set in Turkey
St. Martin's Press books